George Roper was an English football manager. He coached Dutch club side Vitesse Arnhem between 1946 and 1947.

References

Year of birth missing
Year of death missing
English football managers
English expatriate football managers
Expatriate football managers in the Netherlands
English expatriate sportspeople in the Netherlands